Defending champion Novak Djokovic defeated Roger Federer in the final, 6–4, 6–3 to win the men's singles tennis title at the 2015 Italian Open. It was Djokovic's fourth Italian Open title, the second-most of all-time behind Rafael Nadal. This is notable for being the only clay final contested between Djokovic and Federer.

Seeds
The top eight seeds receive a bye into the second round.

Draw

Finals

Top half

Section 1

Section 2

Bottom half

Section 3

Section 4

Qualifying

Seeds

Qualifiers

Qualifying draw

First qualifier

Second qualifier

Third qualifier

Fourth qualifier

Fifth qualifier

Sixth qualifier

Seventh qualifier

References

Main Draw
Qualifying Draw

Men's Singles